Tiariturris spectabilis is a species of small sea snail, a marine gastropod mollusk in the family Pseudomelatomidae.

Description
The length of the shell varies between 55 mm and 75 mm.

Distribution
This marine species occurs from the Sea of Cortez, Western Mexico, to Colombia.

References

 Berry, Samuel Stillman. "West American molluscan miscellany. II." Leaflets in Malacology 1.16 (1958): 91–98.

External links
 
 Gastropods.com: Tiariturris spectabilis

spectabilis
Gastropods described in 1958